Vukan R. Vuchic (born 14 January 1935) is a public transport expert, a professor of the University of Pennsylvania, and a former consultant to the United States Department of Transportation on the planning, design and operation of transport systems. In 1994, he was elected a member of the Serbian Academy of Sciences and Arts.

Public Transport 
Gregory Thompson credits Vuchic with defining the light rail mode of public transportation through his 1972 report that compared nascent subway-streetcar operation in the United States with the current state in Europe, although the concept of light rail had been discussed at least as early as 1962 by Dean Quinby. Vuchic has made a qualified point about the economic value of public transport for cities, assessing the comparative worth of buses, light rail, or rapid transit. In the October 1972 report prepared for the Urban Mass Transportation Administration defining light rail, he notes that each has a particular urban-geographic setting in which is the better choice. Buses, for instance, are superior to light rail in areas of low density. He contrasts that with rapid transit, which is superior wherever high-capacity, high-speed service is warranted, due to greater population density. Light rail is the optimal solution for transit services of the intermediate kind, being competitive with the automobile where there are space restrictions, but where demand is moderate and high-cost investments are not feasible.

Of particular interest is his 1973 study comparing heavy rail service in Lindenwold to bus rapid transit lanes on the Shirley Highway; the Lindenwold High Speed Line (heavy rail) operated with higher ridership and passenger revenues compared to the Shirley Busway, despite the Busway's lower initial capital costs.

Bibliography

References

External links

University of Pennsylvania faculty
1935 births
Living people
American people of Serbian descent
Members of the Serbian Academy of Sciences and Arts
Transport engineers